Günther Franz (13 May 1902 - 22 July 1992) was a German historian who specialized predominantly in  agricultural history and the history of the German Peasants' War. Together with historians Wilhelm Abel and Friedrich Lütge, Franz helped shape the development of German agricultural history and agricultural economics in the postwar period.

Life

Early years
Franz's father, Gottlob Franz, had been the director of a textile factory in Hamburg, but was killed in an industrial accident before Franz's first birthday. His widowed mother relocated to Greiz in the Principality of Reuss-Greiz (now Thuringia), where her family operated a successful paper mill. Franz completed his elementary and secondary schooling in Greiz, and at the age of 12 he followed in the footsteps of his elder brothers by joining the Wandervogel. After the outbreak of the First World War, Franz's eldest brother was killed in France in 1915, aged only 19. Franz graduated from high school in 1921, after which he went to the University of Marburg to study history and German literature. Two semesters later in 1922, he transferred to the  University of Göttingen. He spent the winter of 1923-4 at the University of Munich on a guest semester, and it was during this time in Munich that he began his writings on Bismarck, which would eventually become his dissertation. Immediately after his promotion, he seems to have begun an in-depth study of the German Peasants' War, which research led what would become the subject of his habilitation. Due to his close connection and association with this specific conflict and period in German history, Franz was affectionately given the nickname  (Farmers' Franz) by his students and contemporaries. In 1927 he went to work at the University of Göttingen as an assistant professor under Mayer, and in 1930, he received his habilitation from Wilhelm Mommsen at the University of Marburg. In the winter semester of 1934/35, Franz sat in for Wilhelm Schüssler in his chair at the University of Rostock. Franz's subsequent career was substantially augmented by the influence of his brother-in-law, the legal historian and SS-Sturmbannführer , who, from 1934 onward, was a principal advisor to the Reich Ministry of Science, Education and Culture.

In the spring of 1935, Franz succeeded Karl Hampe in his chair of medieval history at the University of Heidelberg. Prior to this appointment, Franz had published extensively on the Peasants' War, indeed, the definitive work on the subject, but had otherwise written very little on wider medieval history. At Heidelberg, his academic interests took a turn towards  population history, which eventually led him to undertake a study of the Thirty Years War. Also at Heidelberg, in 1939, Franz founded a regional studies society, called the Institut für Fränkisch-Pfälzische Landes- und Volksforschung, which still exists today, as the Institut für Fränkisch-Pfälzische Geschichte und Landeskunde. In 1936, Franz succeeded Alexander Cartellieri as chair of Medieval History at the University of Jena where he was instrumental in the founding of another regional history society, the Anstalt für geschichtliche Landeskunde. Jena was also where Franz first made the acquaintance of fellow historian Erich Maschke, with whom he would form a lifelong friendship, and together they began to publish the series "Arbeiten zur Landes- und Volksforschung." At the height of the Nazi-era, from 1941 to 1945, Franz taught at the Reichsuniversität Straßburg, specializing in "the history of the Reformation and the Thirty Years' War" and in particular "the study of the German national body."

Relationship with the Nazi regime
As an avowed National socialist, Franz was a member of the Nazi party and the Sturmabteilung from 1933. In May 1933 he also became a member of the  National Socialist Teachers League and in November of that year, a member of the  National Socialist People's Welfare. On 11 November 1933, Franz was one of the signatories of the Vow of allegiance of the Professors of the German Universities and High-Schools to Adolf Hitler and the National Socialistic State. in 1935, Franz published a diatribe against the historical establishment, particularly Walter Goetz and the Historical Commission, whose support for the previous Republican government had already soured the Nazi regime against them. In it, he declared a fervent hope that they "cleanse themselves of all the dross that still clings to them, in order to be able to devote themselves fully to the new tasks that are set for them today". By 1937, Franz was awarded the rank of Rottenführer, and posted to the SS Race and Settlement Main Office. Starting in 1939, Franz was a member of the personal staff of Nazi Party's chief idealogue, Alfred Rosenberg, as well as a member of staff at the SS-Ahnenerbe. In 1943, he was promoted to Ober- and, in the same year, to Hauptsturmführer. In his dual role as a professor at the Reichsuniversität Strasbourg and as a staff member in Franz Six's  (Opposition Research Department) supervised a number of dissertations and postdoctoral theses by SD members, thus implementing the overall SS strategy of infiltrating and reforming university historical scholarship.

In many of his works during the Nazi era, Franz provided an ideological basis for the German expansionist policy in the East. He also propagated the ahistorical and antisemitic idea of a Jewish conspiracy to destabilize the Roman Catholic Church, which then triggered the Reformation and the Thirty Years' War. In 1937, he justified Nazi discrimination and persecution of Jews on the grounds that "the Catholic Church has for centuries enacted laws against the Jews which in their basic provisions are completely consistent with the racial laws of the Third Reich." In a nod to his own area of specialty, Franz interpreted Hitler's seizure of power as the completion of the goals of the Peasants' War of 1525. In his role as the scientific coordinator for the RHSA (Reich Security Main Office)'s aformentioned , or Opposition Research Department, Franz initiated and supervised publications on the Jewish Question in particular, which were published in SS and RSHA publication series, including the SS-Leitheft.

The postwar period
After the war, Franz went into hiding in Hesse for several years. IV). V) shortly thereafter. In his unpublished memoirs, written in 1982, Franz himself admitted that his original classification as a  "was basically correct." Publicly, however, he denied that he had ever allowed himself to be "taken in" by National Socialism. Franz was one of the co-founders of the Ranke-Gesellschaft in 1950 and also became editor of the journal Das Historisch-Politische Buch published by the society. After 1945, he worked for the Lower Saxony Office for Regional Planning and Statistics, which was headed by his old friend Kurt Brüning. It took until 1957, longer than for any other historian incriminated, for Franz to be appointed to a chair again. He served as rector there from 1963 to 1967.

Family
Together they had two sons. The elder,  (1931–2015), continued in the family tradition and trained as a historian and an archivist, and served as the head of the Hessian State Archives Darmstadt from 1971 to 1996. The younger,  (1942-), is a theologian and historian, who from 1982 to 2007 served as the head librarian and head archivist of the Municipal Archives in Trier.

Scholarly impact
Franz is considered a pioneer of social history; above all, he gave important momentum to research into the history of the Reformation. Franz's account  (The German Peasant War), published in 1933, was still considered the standard work of research on that subject in West Germany forty years later. The work appeared in a 12th edition in 1984. According to Christopher Clark, Franz's work  remains the "standard work on mortality rates."  Accusations of exaggeration in the intervening period by Sigfrid Henry Steinberg and Hans-Ulrich Wehler, for example, have been invalidated by new studies, according to Clark. Indeed, even more recent accounts commend  as groundbreaking.

Publications
 Der deutsche Bauernkrieg 1525. Deutsche Buch-Gemeinschaft, Berlin 1926.
 Der deutsche Bauernkrieg. München/Berlin 1933 (12., gegenüber der 11. unveränderten Auflage. Wissenschaftliche Buchgesellschaft, Darmstadt 1984, ISBN 3-534-00202-4).
 Bücherkunde zur Geschichte des deutschen Bauerntums (= Der Forschungsdienst, Sonderheft 9), Neumann, Berlin 1938.
 Quellen zur Geschichte des deutschen Bauernstandes in der Neuzeit (= Freiherr vom Stein-Gedächtnisausgabe. Bd. 11). Wissenschaftliche Buchgesellschaft, Darmstadt 1963.
 Quellen zur Geschichte des deutschen Bauernstandes im Mittelalter (= Freiherr vom Stein-Gedächtnisausgabe. Bd. 31). 2., durchgesehene Auflage. Wissenschaftliche Buchgesellschaft, Darmstadt 1974.
 Deutsches Bauerntum im Mittelalter. Wissenschaftliche Buchgesellschaft, Darmstadt 1976, ISBN 3-534-06405-4.
 Der Dreißigjährige Krieg und das deutsche Volk. Untersuchungen zur Bevölkerungs- und Agrargeschichte. 4., neubearbeitete und vermehrte Auflage. Fischer, Stuttgart u. a. 1979, ISBN 3-437-50233-6.

Further reading

Müller, Laurenz (2004). Diktatur und Revolution: Reformation und Bauernkrieg in der Geschichtsschreibung des "Dritten Reiches" und der DDR. Stuttgart: De Gruyter. 

Seidelmann, Wolf-Ingo (2019). Proske, Wolfgang (ed.). Prof. Dr. Günther Franz: "Ich war aus Überzeugung Nationalsozialist". Täter, Helfer, Trittbrettfahrer. Vol. 10: NS-Belastete aus der Region Stuttgart. Gerstetten: Kugelberg.

References

1902 births
1992 deaths
German historians
People from Hamburg
University of Marburg alumni
University of Göttingen alumni
Sturmabteilung personnel
SS-Hauptsturmführer
Historians of agriculture
Academic staff of the University of Jena